Probable ATP-dependent RNA helicase DHX36 also known as DEAH box protein 36 (DHX36) or MLE-like protein 1 (MLEL1) or G4 resolvase 1 (G4R1) or RNA helicase associated with AU-rich elements (RHAU) is an enzyme that in humans is encoded by the DHX36 gene.

Structure 

Structurally, DHX36 is a 1008 amino acid-long modular protein that has been crystallized in a complex with a DNA G-quadruplex. It consists of a ~440-amino acid helicase core comprising all signature motifs of the DEAH/RHA family of helicases with N- and C-terminal flanking regions of ~180 and ~380 amino acids, respectively. Part of the N-terminal flanking region forms an alpha-helix called the DHX36-specific motif, which recognizes the 5'-most G-quadruplex quartet.  The OB-fold domain binds to the 3'-most G-tract sugar-phosphate backbone.  Like all the DEAH/RHA helicases, the helicase associated domain is located adjacent to the helicase core region and occupies 75% of the C-terminal region.

Function 

DEAH/RHA proteins are RNA and DNA helicases typically characterized by low processivity translocation on substrates and the capability to bind/unwind non-canonical nucleic acid secondary structures. They are implicated in a number of cellular processes involving alteration of RNA secondary structure such as translation initiation, nuclear and mitochondrial splicing, and ribosome and spliceosome assembly. Based on their distribution patterns, some members of this DEAH/RHA protein family are believed to be involved in embryogenesis, spermatogenesis, and cellular growth and division.

DHX36 exhibits a unique ATP-dependent guanine-quadruplex (G4) resolvase activity and specificity for its substrate in vitro.  DHX36 displays repetitive unwinding activity as a function of the thermal stability of the G-quadruplex substrate, characteristic of a number of other G-quadruplex resolvases such as the BLM/WRN helicases.  DHX36 binds G4-nucleic acid with sub-nanomolar affinity and unwinds G4 structures much more efficiently than double-stranded nucleic acid. Consistent with these biochemical observations, DHX36 was also identified as the major source of tetramolecular RNA-resolving activity in HeLa cell lysates.

Previous work showed that DHX36 associates with mRNAs and re-localises to stress granules (SGs) upon translational arrest induced by various environmental stresses. A region of the first 105 amino acid was shown to be critical for RNA binding and re-localisation to SGs.

References

Further reading

External links 
 Group Yoshikuni Nagamine homepage
 Group Steven Akman homepage

EC 3.6.4
G-quadruplex